The 1926 season was the Hawthorn Football Club's second season in the Victorian Football League and 25th overall since its creation in 1904.

Fixture

Premiership season

Ladder

References

Hawthorn Football Club seasons